The  was an army of the Imperial Japanese Army during the Second Sino-Japanese War.

History
The Japanese 21st Army was formed on September 19, 1938 under the Imperial General Headquarters. It was transferred to the control of the China Expeditionary Army on September 23, 1939 and assigned the primary role in the Canton Operation (the invasion of Guangdong Province in southern China), together with the Imperial Japanese Navy’s 5th Fleet.

On October 12, the 18th and 104th Divisions landed, followed by command units the following day. By October 21, the provincial capital of Guangzhou was under Japanese control. The IJA 5th Division continued to advance up the Pearl River and by November 5 had taken the city of Foshan. By the end of November, the entire province was under Japanese control.

The Japanese 21st Army was disbanded on February 9, 1940. Its command staff joined the staff of the Japanese Southern China Area Army, and its divisions were reassigned to other areas.

List of Commanders

Commanding officer

Chief of Staff

Organization (as of February 9, 1940)

21st Army 
 5th Infantry Division
 9th Infantry Brigade
 11th Infantry Regiment
 41st Infantry Regiment
 21st Infantry Brigade
 21st Infantry Regiment
 42nd Infantry Regiment
 5th Mountain Artillery Regiment
 5th Cavalry Regiment
 5th Engineer Regiment
 5th Transport Regiment
 18th Infantry Division
 23rd Infantry Brigade
 55th Infantry Regiment
 56th Infantry Regiment
 35th Infantry Brigade
 114th Infantry Regiment
 124th Infantry Regiment
 22nd Cavalry Battalion
 18th Mountain Artillery Regiment
 12th Military Engineer Regiment
 12th Transport Regiment
 38th Infantry Division
228th Infantry Regiment
229th Infantry Regiment
230th Infantry Regiment
 104th Infantry Division
 107th Infantry Brigade
 108th Infantry Regiment
 170th Infantry Regiment
 132nd Infantry Brigade
 137th Infantry Regiment
 161st Infantry Regiment
 104th Field Artillery Regiment
 104th Cavalry Regiment
 104th Engineer Regiment
 104th Transport Regiment
 106th Infantry Division
 111th Mountain Artillery Regiment
 10th Independent Mountain Artillery Regiment
 15th Independent Military Engineer Regiment

References

External links

21
Military units and formations established in 1938
Military units and formations disestablished in 1940